Phil Spencer: Secret Agent is a Channel 4 television show, presented by property expert Phil Spencer of Location, Location, Location.

Format
Each episode features a house which the owners are struggling to sell. Spencer acts as their "secret agent", viewing the property without them present and preparing his own alternative set of sales particulars, entitled "The Brutal Truth", designed to show why the property is not selling. The owners then have a week to act on Spencer's suggestions before hosting an open day for buyers. From 2013 onwards, each episode features two properties.

Secret Agent Down Under
Phil Spencer also presents an Australian version of the show, again for Channel 4.

External links

2012 British television series debuts
Channel 4 original programming